No Other Woman is a 1928 American silent drama film directed by Lou Tellegen and starring Dolores del Río. It was released by Fox Film Corporation on June 10, 1928.

Cast
Dolores del Río as Carmelita de Granados
Don Alvarado as Maurice
Ben Bard as Albert
Paulette Duval as Mafalda
Rosita Marstini as Carmelita's Aunt
André Lanoy as Grand Duke Sergey

See also
Dolores del Río filmography
1937 Fox vault fire

Preservation status
No Other Woman is considered to be a lost film with no archival prints preserved.

References

External links

1928 films
1920s English-language films
American silent feature films
Lost American films
Fox Film films
Films with screenplays by Bernard Vorhaus
American black-and-white films
American romantic drama films
1928 romantic drama films
Films directed by Lou Tellegen
1920s American films
Silent romantic drama films
Silent American drama films